Tugaloo State Park is a 393 acre (1.59 km2) state park located on the shore of Lake Hartwell in Franklin County, Georgia. The park features a swimming beach, boat ramps, and ample fishing opportunities, and is located near S.R. 328 north of Lavonia.

Facilities

393 Acres 
108 Tent, Trailer, and RV Campsites ($27–$30) 
6 Primitive Campsites 
20 Cottages  
Swimming beach
Tennis courts 
7 Picnic shelters 
Group shelter   
Pioneer campground
6 Yurts

External links
Georgia State Parks

 

State parks of Georgia (U.S. state)
Protected areas of Franklin County, Georgia